The cast of the television series MythBusters perform experiments to verify or debunk urban legends, old wives' tales, and the like. This is a list of the various myths tested on the show as well as the results of the experiments (the myth is Busted, Plausible, or Confirmed).

Episode overview

Episode 114 – "Demolition Derby"
 Original air date: April 8, 2009
This episode was an 87-minute-long special. The vehicles that were demolished during the episode all received an end credit in the form of an in memoriam (spelled in memorium on screen).

Need for Speed

Hollywood Crash Test
Based on numerous car chase scenes in films, the Build Team tested myths based on whether cars would be able to successfully drive through/into various obstructions. Two criteria were used to test each scenario: whether the real crash appeared similar to its Hollywood counterpart, and whether the car could be driven away afterward. They crashed into...

Car Drop Chaos

Compact Compact Supersized

Episode 115 – "Alaska Special"
 Original air date: April 15, 2009

As part of Discovery Channel's Alaska Week 2009 series, the MythBusters returned to Alaska to test more cold weather myths.

Pykrete Peril
Based on Geoffrey Pyke's proposed project of building an aircraft carrier out of pykrete during World War II, which was never put into practice because the war ended, the MythBusters decided to test the viability of making a pykrete boat.

In additional footage shown on the MythBusters website, two additional tests were shown.
 Blocks of ice and regular pykrete were placed on nails against a board at room temperature.  The ice melted significantly faster than the pykrete.
 A "shock test" was performed on the three materials by dropping a block of each approximately six feet onto the ground.  The block of ice shattered into many pieces.  The block of regular pykrete broke into two pieces, but did not shatter.  The block of pseudo-pykrete would not break, even when slammed down from the same height.

Snowplow Split

Episode 116 – "Banana Slip/Double-Dip"
 Original air date: April 22, 2009

Banana Peel Slip

Homemade Diamonds
The Build Team tested several myths that involve creating diamonds with household materials such as...

Unable to produce any diamonds using household items, the Build Team went on to test whether...

Double Dipping

Episode 117 – "YouTube Special"
 Original air date: April 29, 2009

Adam, Jamie, and the Build Team tested three myths drawn from videos seen on YouTube.

Match Bomb

LEGO Ball

Spinning Tire Fire

Homemade Surround Sound
This myth was not shown in the actual episode aired in the United States, but was featured in the version of the episode aired outside of North America and on the MythBusters website and included in the iTunes download as an extra scene. It was based on a video created by the YouTube user: Household Hacker.

Episode 118 – "Swimming in Syrup"
 Original air date: May 6, 2009

Adam and Jamie explored the physics of swimming in syrup, while the Build Team probed two "magic bullet" myths.

Swimming in Syrup

MacGyver's Magic Bullets

Davy Crockett's Magic Bullet

Episode 119 – "Exploding Bumper"
 Original air date: May 13, 2009

Exploding Bumpers

Medieval Mayhem

Episode 120 – "Seesaw Saga"
 Original air date: May 20, 2009

Adam, Jamie, and the Build Team joined forces to investigate a puzzling seesaw myth. This is the second myth in which the MythBusters and the Build Team tested a myth together.

Episode 121 – "Thermite vs. Ice"
 Original air date: May 27, 2009

Thermite vs. Ice

Woofer Weaponry

Handgun Horror

Episode 122 – "Prison Escape"
 Original air date: June 3, 2009

Car Cling
Adam and Jamie tested whether or not a person could...

Floss to Freedom

Cannonball Escape

Episode 123 – "Curving Bullet"
 Original air date: June 10, 2009

Sonic Boom Sound-off

To help test this myth, the MythBusters enlisted the aid of the Blue Angels and their F/A-18 Hornets.

Bend a Bullet
This myth was inspired by scenes from the film version of Wanted.

Episode 124 – "Car vs. Rain"
 Original air date: June 17, 2009

Driving in the Rain in a Convertible

Popcorn Pandemonium
The Build Team tested various myths involving popcorn.

Episode 125 – "Knock Your Socks Off"
 Original air date: October 7, 2009

Bullet Fired vs. Bullet Dropped

Knock Your Socks Off

Episode 126 – "Duct Tape Hour"
 Original air date: October 14, 2009

The MythBusters tackle various myths relating to the "handyman's secret weapon". They tested whether or not duct tape can...

Episode 127 – "Clean Car vs. Dirty Car"
 Original air date: October 21, 2009

Adam and Jamie test whether a dirty car gets better gas mileage than an equivalent clean car, while the Build Team test an old adage concerning beer, liquor, and hangovers.

Dirty Car Cash

The Morning After

Episode 128 – "Greased Lightning"
 Original air date: October 28, 2009

The MythBusters test two potential kitchen disasters, as well as whether cheese can be used with a cannon.

Grease Fire Fiasco

Microwave Mayhem

Cheese Cannon

Episode 129 – "Hurricane Windows"
 Original air date: November 4, 2009
Adam and Jamie tested whether windows should be open or closed during a hurricane, while the Build Team took on two myths involving liquid nitrogen.

Hurricane Windows

Liquid Nitrogen Myths

Episode 130 – "Crash and Burn"
 Original US air date: November 11, 2009
 Original UK air date: November 2, 2009

Crash and Burn
Adam and Jamie tested whether a car would explode when driven off a cliff.

Rocket Man
The Build Team saw if a rocket could launch a cage containing a human.

Episode 131 – "Myth Evolution"

 Original air date: November 18, 2009
The MythBusters test new tangents from five previous myths.

Exploding Water Heater

Corner Shot
The Build Team tested various Hollywood methods for shooting around corners, beginning with an offshoot of the "Bend a Bullet" myth from episode 123.

Grant and Tory also tested other techniques of shooting around a corner in Hollywood movies. Starting from Kari's position at the doorway, they tried to hit the target in the room by...

According to Tory, this "complete set" appears to have set a first on MythBusters, where three myths were tested simultaneously with one Confirmed, one Plausible, and the other Busted.

Car Cling (Cardboard Box Wall Crash)
Taking off from the original Car Cling myth, Adam and Jamie tested whether or not someone could...

The MythBusters pointed out that the tests were done with empty cardboard boxes, as they seemingly are in many Hollywood movies. A different result may suffice if they contained any shipment, especially heavy ones like electronics or "anvils."

Liquid Lock Pick
Fans requested having this myth tested after the original Liquid Nitrogen myths were shown in the Hurricane Windows episode.

Snowplow Rocket Replication
The original Snowplow Split tests shown in the second Alaska Special focused only on the circumstances of the myth. This new, supersized test presented below looked onto the results.

Episode 132 – "Dumpster Diving"
 Original air date: November 25, 2009

Adam and Jamie test a Hollywood chase scene jump, while the Build Team probes a gruesome diving disaster. Kari departs to begin her maternity leave, and Jessi Combs joins the build team in her absence.

Dumpster Diving

The Squeeze

Episode 133 – "Antacid Jail Break"
 Original air date: December 2, 2009

Adam and Jamie put a story of a prisoner's escape to the test, while the Build Team investigates a supposedly foolproof method for smugglers to avoid detection.

Antacid Jail Break

Driving in the Dark

Episode 134 – "Unarmed and Unharmed"
 Original air date: December 9, 2009

Adam and Jamie test the Hollywood cowboy's ability to shoot a gun out of a villain's hand, while the Build Team tries to re-create a big-budget bus jump.

Unarmed & Unharmed

Speed Bus Jump

Episode 135 – "Hidden Nasties"
 Original air date: December 16, 2009

Adam and Jamie tackle two health-hazard myths, while the Build Team tries to skip a car like a stone.

Rat Pee Soda

Car Skip

Hidden Nasties

Episode 136 – "Mini-Myth Mayhem"
 Original air date: December 28, 2009

The MythBusters examine six small, bizarre tales. A notice appears after the end credits honoring rocketry expert Erik Gates, who contributed materials and expertise for several segments. He died in a construction accident on December 20, 2009.

Ear Wax Candle

Camp Prank

Gorn Cannon

Lead Plunge

References

External links

 MythBusters Official site
 

2009 American television seasons
2009
Davy Crockett